The 18th British Academy Video Game Awards was hosted by the British Academy of Film and Television Arts on 7 April 2022 to honour the best video games of 2021. Held at the Queen Elizabeth Hall in London, television presenter Elle Osili-Wood returned to host the ceremony for the second time. Co-operative action-adventure platformer It Takes Two and third-person roguelike shooter Returnal both led the nominations with nine. Returnal won four awards at the ceremony, the most wins of any game.

Nominees and winners 
Most nominations were announced on 3 March 2022, while the nominations for performers were announced on 16 March 2022.

Games with multiple nominations and wins

Nominations

Wins

References

British Academy Games Awards ceremonies
British Academy Games
British Academy Games
British Academy Games